Symphoricarpos sinensis is an uncommon Chinese species of shrubs in the honeysuckle family. It has been found in the Provinces of Gansu, Guangxi, Hubei, Shaanxi, Sichuan, and Yunnan in central and southern China.

Habitat and range
Symphoricarpos sinensis is an erect shrub up to 250 cm (8 1/3 feet) tall. It has 3 to 6 pairs of white, bell-shaped flowers and dark blue fruits with waxy coatings.

References

External links

sinensis
Flora of China
Plants described in 1911